Sebastián Cirac Estopañán (1903–1970) was a Spanish philologist and linguist.

Spanish philologists
Linguists from Spain
20th-century Spanish Roman Catholic priests
1903 births
1970 deaths
20th-century linguists
20th-century philologists